Al-Ishaqi Sport Club is an Iraqi football team based in Saladin, that plays in Iraq Division Three.

Managerial history
  Haitham Rashad
  Ayad Abbas Al-Baldawi

Famous players
Hammadi Ahmed (2002–2004)

See also 
 2021–22 Iraq Division Three

References

External links
 Al-Ishaqi SC on Goalzz.com
 Iraq Clubs- Foundation Dates

1995 establishments in Iraq
Association football clubs established in 1995
Football clubs in Saladin